Daniel Ogunmade (born 26 October 1983) is a Scottish-Nigerian footballer who played as a forward. He played professionally in Scotland for Dundee United and Stenhousemuir, as well as for Forfar Athletic and Ross County on loan. In 2005, he moved to the United States to study, where he played college soccer before retiring from the sport.

Early life
Ogunmade was born in Lagos, Nigeria. When he was 9 years old his family moved to Scotland, where he grew up in the Garrowhill area of Glasgow.

Career
Ogunmade started his career with Dundee United. He was loaned to lower league clubs Forfar Athletic and Ross County. After leaving United in 2004, Ogunmade played as a trialist for Stenhousemuir and had a spell with Junior side Bellshill Athletic. After failing to win a deal in Britain, Ogunmade moved to the US, where his form for Northern Oklahoma College led to NSCAA All-American recognition in 2007. Ogunmade moved to Georgia-based Mercer University in 2007.

References

External links

Living people
1983 births
Footballers from Glasgow
Scottish footballers
British expatriates in the United States
Scottish Premier League players
Scottish Football League players
Dundee United F.C. players
Forfar Athletic F.C. players
Ross County F.C. players
Stenhousemuir F.C. players
Bellshill Athletic F.C. players
Mercer University alumni
Black British sportsmen
British sportspeople of Nigerian descent
Scottish people of Nigerian descent
Scottish people of Yoruba descent
Sportspeople from Lagos
Nigerian emigrants to the United Kingdom
Nigerian people of British descent
Yoruba sportspeople
Association football forwards